First Church of Christ, Scientist, Berkeley, now also known as Christian Science Society, Berkeley, is a Christian Science church, located at 2619 Dwight Way at Bowditch Street across the street from People's Park, in Berkeley, in Alameda County, California.

The Christian Science Society, Berkeley continues to meet in their over-100-year-old church building.

History 

The historic 1910 church was designed by renowned architect Bernard Ralph Maybeck (1862–1957), in a primarily American Craftsman style, with Byzantine Revival, Romanesque Revival, and Gothic Revival style elements. The church is widely considered one of Maybeck's masterpieces.

The basic plan is that of a square or Greek cross, with two pair of great crossed trusses spanning the central space overhead. In 1929 a Sunday School addition was added to the Church.

Landmark 
It was declared a National Historic Landmark in 1977, and is on the National Register of Historic Places in Alameda County, California.

In October 2005, the Friends of First Church Berkeley were awarded a prestigious federal Save America's Treasurers (SAT) Grant, for the roof replacement and seismic strengthening of the 1910 Church and much of the 1929 Sunday School addition. The church received a Getty Architectural Conservation Implementation Grant in 2006, to enable the completion of the seismic strengthening of the Church and Sunday School addition. In 2009 and 2010, the Friends of First Church Berkeley received University of California Berkeley Chancellor's Community Partnership Grants for restoring the garden setting of the church.

See also 
 
 List of Berkeley, California Landmarks, Structures of Merit, and Historic Districts
 National Register of Historic Places listings in Alameda County, California

References

External links 

 
 Friends of First Church Berkeley — Bernard Maybeck's architectural masterpiece

Churches in Alameda County, California
Buildings and structures in Berkeley, California
Christian Science churches in California
Churches on the National Register of Historic Places in California
National Register of Historic Places in Berkeley, California
National Historic Landmarks in the San Francisco Bay Area
1910 establishments in California
Churches completed in 1910
Bernard Maybeck buildings
American Craftsman architecture in California
Byzantine Revival architecture in California
Gothic Revival church buildings in California
Romanesque Revival church buildings in California